The 2021–22 West Virginia Mountaineers men's basketball team represented West Virginia University during the 2021–22 NCAA Division I men's basketball season. The Mountaineers were coached by Bob Huggins, in his 15th season as WVU's head coach, and played their home games at the WVU Coliseum in Morgantown, West Virginia as members of the Big 12 Conference.

Previous season
In a season limited due to the ongoing COVID-19 pandemic, the Mountaineers finished the 2020–21 season 19–10, 11–6 in Big 12 play to finish in a tie for third place in the conference. They lost in the quarterfinals of the Big 12 tournament to Oklahoma State. They received an at-large bid to the NCAA tournament where they defeated Morehead State in the first round before losing to Syracuse in Second Round.

Offseason

Departures

Incoming transfers

Recruiting classes

2021 recruiting class

2022 recruiting class

Roster

Schedule and results 

|-
!colspan=12 style=| Exhibition

|-
!colspan=12 style=| Regular season

|-
!colspan=12 style=| Big 12 tournament

Source

References

West Virginia Mountaineers men's basketball seasons
West Virginia
West Virginia
West Virginia